Russian singer Tatiana Bulanova has released twenty-two studio albums, ten compilation album, one video album, forty-one singles, and forty-three music videos.

Albums

Studio albums

Compilations

Video albums

Singles

References

External links 
 
 
 

Discographies of Russian artists
Pop music discographies